James Bernard Walter (August 15, 1908 – October 30, 1988) was a Major League Baseball pitcher who played in  with the Pittsburgh Pirates. He batted and threw right-handed. 

He was born in Dover, Tennessee and died in Nashville, Tennessee.

External links

1908 births
1988 deaths
People from Dover, Tennessee
Major League Baseball pitchers
Baseball players from Tennessee
Pittsburgh Pirates players